Dima or DIMA may refer to:

Acronym 
 Department of Immigration and Multicultural Affairs (1996–2001), Australian federal government agency
 Department of Immigration and Multicultural Affairs (2006–2007), Australian federal government agency
 DIMA (database), Domain Interaction Map database
 Dong-ah Institute of Media and Arts, in Korea

People 
 Dimitrij Ovtcharov (born 1988), German table tennis player
 Dima Al Kasti (born 2001), Lebanese footballer
 Dima Bilan (born 1981), Russian pop artist
 Dima Kash (born 1989), Russian-born singer-songwriter and rapper based in Twin Cities, Minnesota
 Dima Grigoriev (born 1954), mathematician
 Dima Kandalaft (born 1979), Syrian actress and singer
 Dima Orsho (born 1975), Syrian soprano
 Dima Wannous (born 1982), Syrian writer and translator
 Dima Khatib (born 1971), journalist, poet and translator
 Dima Tahboub (born 1976), writer, political analyst, member of Jordan's Muslim Brotherhood
 Dima Trofim (born 1989), Romanian singer, dancer, actor, and former member of the LaLa band
 Dima al-Wawi (born 2003), youngest Palestinian prisoner in Israeli jails
 Dima, a diminutive of the eastern Slavic first name Dmitry
 Dima, a diminutive of the Russian male first name Avudim
 DIMA, an alias of French electronic artist Vitalic

Places 
 Dima, Burkina Faso, a village in Banwa Province, Burkina Faso
 Dima, Ethiopia (disambiguation), several places that share the name
 Dima, Spain, a town in northern Spain
 Dima Sara, a village in Gilan Province, Iran
 Dimapur, India ("-pur" means "city")

Other uses 
 Dima (album), an album by Algerian R&B singer Zaho
 Dima (beetle), a click beetle genus
 Dima language, a Papuan language of New Guinea
 "Dima", a baby woolly mammoth specimen

See also
 Dimas (disambiguation)
 Dina (disambiguation)
 Dimasa (disambiguation)
 Dyna